I Am is Michael Tolcher's debut album, produced by Pop Rox. It was released on Octone Records on 4 May 2004.

Four of the songs had previously appeared on Tolcher's self-titled EP, released in 2003.

"Sooner Or Later" was used as the theme song for ABC's 2004-2005 series Life As We Know It.

Track listing
"Mission Responsible" – 3:49
"Sooner or Later" – 3:49
"No One Above" – 3:16
"The Sun Song" – 4:04
"Bad Habits" – 4:19
"This Is What I Mean By That" – 3:13
"I Am" – 3:50
"Taxi Ride Kinda Night" – 2:25
"Kiss and Tell" – 3:02
"Miracle" – 3:17
"Kings In Castles" – 3:36
"Waiting" – 3:56

Credits
Michael Tolcher – vocals, guitar
Warren Haynes – guitar, vocals
Eddie Martinez – guitar
Gary Phillips – guitar
Robbie Kondor – piano
Gavin DeGraw – piano, vocals
Peter Levin – keyboards
Paul Frazier – bass
Carl Carter – bass
Mo Roberts – drums
Steven Wolf – drums
Steve Williams – drums
Duke Mushroom – percussion
Questlove – additional percussion
Chris Shaw – recording engineer

References

2004 debut albums
Michael Tolcher albums
A&M Octone Records albums